Stanley Stephens or Stevens may refer to:

 Stan Stephens (1929–2021), American politician
 Stanley Stephens (Australian politician) (1913–1986), member of the New South Wales Legislative Assembly
 Stanley Stephens (cricketer) (1883–1965), Australian cricketer
 Stanley Smith Stevens (1906–1973), American psychologist